The Downing Street Declaration (DSD) was a joint declaration issued on 15 December 1993 by the Prime Minister of the United Kingdom, John Major, and the Taoiseach of the Republic of Ireland, Albert Reynolds, at the British Prime Minister's office in 10 Downing Street. 

The declaration affirmed both the right of the people of Ireland to self-determination, and that Northern Ireland would be transferred to the Republic of Ireland from the United Kingdom only if a majority of its population was in favour of such a move. It also included, as part of the prospective of the so-called "Irish dimension", the principle of consent that the people of the island of Ireland had the exclusive right to solve the issues between North and South by mutual consent. 

The latter statement, which later would become one of the points of the Good Friday Agreement, was key to produce a positive change of attitude by the republicans towards a negotiated settlement.  The joint declaration also pledged the governments to seek a peaceful constitutional settlement, and promised that parties linked with paramilitaries (such as Sinn Féin) could take part in the talks, so long as they abandoned violence.

The declaration, after a meeting between Sinn Féin President Gerry Adams and American congressman Bruce Morrison, which was followed by a joint statement issued by Adams and John Hume, was considered sufficient by the Provisional Irish Republican Army to announce a ceasefire on 31 August 1994 which was then followed on 13 October by an announcement of a ceasefire from the Combined Loyalist Military Command.

See also
Principle of consent

Notes

External links
 Photos & Recordings of the Inaugural Meeting of the College Historical Society held on the Downing Street Declaration, reuniting Sir John Major, Sir Roderic Lyne and Martin Mansergh in November 2007.
 Downing Street Declaration. Department of Foreign Affairs. Ireland.
 House of Commons Hansard Debates for December 15, 1993. The Prime Minister speaks to the House of Commons about the Downing Street/Joint Declaration. 
 Research guide from University of Ulster on The Troubles, cain.ulst.ac.uk; accessed 4 March 2016. 

Politics of Northern Ireland
History of Northern Ireland
Ireland–United Kingdom relations
1993 in the United Kingdom
1993 in Northern Ireland
1993 in Ireland
1993 in international relations
Northern Ireland peace process
December 1993 events in the United Kingdom